Billy is a civil parish in County Antrim, Northern Ireland. According to the Topographical Dictionary of Ireland, published by Samuel Lewis in 1837, it then had approximately 5800 inhabitants.

See also
List of civil parishes of County Antrim

References

Civil parishes of County Antrim